Robert Tom is a Ni-Vanuatu footballer who plays as a defender.

References

External links 
 

Living people
1978 births
Vanuatuan footballers
Vanuatu international footballers
Association football defenders
2012 OFC Nations Cup players